Pakpattan Tehsil , is an administrative subdivision (tehsil) of Pakpattan District in the Punjab province of Pakistan. The city of Pakpattan is the headquarters of the tehsil which is administratively subdivided into five Union Councils.

Administration
The tehsil of Pakpattan  is administratively subdivided into 33  Union Councils, these are:

Educational Institutes

Pakpattan District
Tehsils of Punjab, Pakistan